The Ghetto Twiinz is an American hip hop duo from New Orleans, Louisiana, composed of twin sisters Tonya and Tremethia Jupiter. From 1995 to 2001, the women released four albums, all of which made it to the Billboard Charts.

Biography
Twin sisters Tonya and Tremethia Jupiter who were born in New Orleans in  Louisiana, formed the Ghetto Twiinz in 1991 and were signed to independent record label, Big Boy Records, in 1994. After their debut album Surrounded By Criminals was released in 1996, they would join Rap-a-Lot Records and Noo Trybe Records. They would release three more albums In That Water (1997), No Pain No Gain (1998) and Got It on My Mind (2001) before disappearing from the music scene until releasing an EP Them People Coming in 2011.

On December 16, 2010 the Ghetto Twiinz returned to the stage at the House of Blues New Orleans and opened up for Mystikal, another prodigal performer recently returned to the limelight. Mannie Fresh primed the crowd for what was a spectacular display of showmanship on behalf of the twins.

Discography

Studio albums

Extended plays

American hip hop groups
Southern hip hop musicians
Musical groups from New Orleans
American twins
Sibling musical duos
Musical groups established in 1995
Gangsta rap groups